Appias drusilla, the Florida white or tropical white, is a butterfly in the family Pieridae. It is found in tropical America from Brazil north to southern peninsular Florida and the Florida Keys and Antilles. It frequently visits coastal Texas and is a rare stray to Nebraska and Colorado. The habitat consists of tropical lowland evergreen or semideciduous forests.

Males are solid white on both the upper and lower surfaces of the wings except for a narrow edging of black along the forewing costal margin. The female has two forms: the dry-season form is all white and the wet-season form has black along the forewing costal margin and a yellow-orange upper hindwing. The dry-season form is on wing from October to April and the wet-season form from May to September. They feed on flower nectar from a variety of weeds and garden plants including Lantana and Eupatorium.

The larvae feed on Brassicaceae species, including Drypetes lateriflora and Capparis flexuosa in Florida. They are shade loving and feed during the night and on cloudy days.

Subspecies
The following subspecies are recognised:
A. d. drusilla (Peru, Argentina, Brazil: Rio de Janeiro, Rondônia)
A. d. castalia (Fabricius, 1793) (Jamaica)
A. d. poeyi (Butler, 1872) (Cuba)
A. d. neumoegenii (Skinner, 1894) (Florida)
A. d. monomorpha Hall, 1936 (Grenada)
A. d. boydi Comstock, 1943 (Dominican Republic)
A. d. comstocki Dillon, 1947 (Dominica)
A. d. tenuis Lamas, 1981 (Peru)

References

External links

drusilla
Butterflies of North America
Pieridae of South America
Lepidoptera of the Caribbean
Fauna of Brazil
Insects of Mexico
Butterflies described in 1777